National Route 7 (N7) is a , two to six lane, major primary route that forms part of the Philippine highway network, running from Bacolod to Bayawan.

History 

The highways of N7 were built possibly around the Spanish or American colonial period. Highway Routes were announced during 2014. During early 2017 or October 2016 as evidenced in google maps, most of the routes received its route markers, one of them being N7 highway. The roads assigned to N7 are a part of Bacolod South Road from Bacolod to Negros Occidental Provincial Capitol, Bacolod North Road from Bacolod to San Carlos, Dumaguete North Road from Vallehermoso to Negros Oriental’s kilometer 0, Dumaguete South Road from Dumaguete to Bayawan and Mayor Ramon T. Pastor Street. It is the main route of eastern portion of the island.

Route description

Bacolod 

The route starts from a route change from N6 and a junction to Negros Occidental Eco-Tourism Highway (N69). After the route reaches the provincial capitol and kilometer 0, the road makes its northern terminus and is now considered as Bacolod North Road.

Bacolod to San Carlos 

The route continues north as Bacolod North Road onwards. It traverses several municipalities and cities in the northern part of the province. After reaching the boundary of Negros Occidental and Negros Oriental, the road ends and turns ≈to Dumaguete North Road.

Vallehermoso to Dumaguete 
The route continues as Dumaguete North Road onwards. It is mostly a straight road with turns and curves. It traverses few cities, being Guihulngan, Bais, Tanjay and Dumaguete. Upon reaching the last city, the road decreases its kilometer count to zero, ending the Dumaguete North Road portion and starting the Dumaguete South Road portion.

Dumaguete to Bayawan 
The road continues as Dumaguete South Road after the kilometer zero. Unlike in Dumaguete North Road, the direction is forward, which means the kilometer count is ascending. A shortcut road called Mayor Ramon T. Pastor Street, designated as N7 starts and ends in the former road. The route traverses to southern Negros Oriental and ends in a route change from N7 to N712 and a junction of N717.

References 

Roads in Negros Occidental
Roads in Negros Oriental